The 1988–89 NBA season was the Nuggets' 13th season in the NBA and 22nd season as a franchise. During the off-season, the team signed free agent All-Star guard Walter Davis. The Nuggets got off to an 11–4 start to the season, but played below .500 afterwards, as Bill Hanzlik only played just 41 games due to a back injury. At midseason, the team traded Jay Vincent and Calvin Natt to the San Antonio Spurs in exchange for Dave Greenwood and Darwin Cook, and held a 25–23 record at the All-Star break. Despite losing six of their final eight games, the Nuggets finished third in the Midwest Division with a 44–38 record, while posting a very successful 35–6 home record. 

Alex English averaged 26.5 points and 4.7 assists per game, and was selected for the 1989 NBA All-Star Game, while Fat Lever averaged 19.8 points, 9.3 rebounds, 7.9 assists and 2.7 steals per game, and Michael Adams provided the team with 18.5 points, 6.4 assists and 2.2 steals per game. In addition, Davis played a sixth man role, and contributed 15.6 points per game off the bench, while Danny Schayes provided with 12.8 points and 6.6 rebounds per game, and Wayne Cooper averaged 6.6 points, 7.8 rebounds and 2.7 blocks per game.

However, in the playoffs, due to injuries to Lever (thigh bruise), Adams (hamstring), and Schayes (sprained ankle), the Nuggets were swept by the Phoenix Suns in three straight games in the Western Conference First Round. Following the season, Cooper signed as a free agent with the Portland Trail Blazers, and Greenwood and Cook were both released to free agency.

Draft picks

Roster

Regular season

Season standings

z - clinched division title
y - clinched division title
x - clinched playoff spot

Record vs. opponents

Game log

Playoffs

|- align="center" bgcolor="#ffcccc"
| 1
| April 28
| @ Phoenix
| L 103–104
| Walter Davis (34)
| Fat Lever (12)
| Fat Lever (17)
| Arizona Veterans Memorial Coliseum14,471
| 0–1
|- align="center" bgcolor="#ffcccc"
| 2
| April 30
| @ Phoenix
| L 114–132
| Alex English (36)
| Michael Adams (12)
| English, Cook (6)
| Arizona Veterans Memorial Coliseum14,471
| 0–2
|- align="center" bgcolor="#ffcccc"
| 3
| May 2
| Phoenix
| L 121–130
| Walter Davis (26)
| Elston Turner (7)
| Bill Hanzlik (6)
| McNichols Sports Arena12,660
| 0–3
|-

Player statistics

Season

Playoffs

Awards and records

Transactions

References

See also
 1988-89 NBA season

Denver Nuggets seasons
1988 in sports in Colorado
1989 in sports in Colorado
Denver